Spye Park may refer to:
Spye Park, Wiltshire, an estate house in England
 Spye Park (White Plains, Maryland), listed on the NRHP in Maryland